The Yonkers Fire Department (YFD) provides fire protection and emergency medical services to the city of Yonkers, New York, United States.

The department currently responds to approximately 15,000 emergency calls annually. The current Chief of Department/Fire Commissioner is Robert Sweeney.

History

Early Years
Firefighting in Yonkers originated in 1852 when the first fire company, Protection Engine Co. 1, was formed there. The following year, in 1853, the Hope Hook & Ladder Co. 1 was formed, as well as the Lady Washington Engine Co. 2. In 1855, all fire companies in Yonkers were privately owned and not under the jurisdiction of village authorities. The village appropriated funds to purchase the fire apparatus from the private citizens who owned the fire companies. From 1868 until the late 1890s, fourteen additional fire companies were formed including The City of Yonkers Fire Department (YFD), established in 1896. By 1888, the volunteer fire companies in Yonkers had grown to 386 firemen. In 1895, fire commissioners were authorized by the Yonkers Common Council after the city charter was revised.

On August 6, 1896, the Fire Commissioner's Board appointed six paid firemen to the Palisade Avenue Firehouse. Three paid firemen were appointed to the Hope Hook & Ladder Co. 1, and three men were appointed to the Lady Washington Engine Co. 2, both quartered in the same firehouse. The appointments marked the first paid firemen in the Yonkers Fire Department. In October 1897, five paid firemen were added to the firehouse on Vineyard Avenue (Station 2).

On August 27, 1896, James J. Mulcahey was elected the first paid chief of the Department. With the new paid fire department in place, the YFD Telegraph Bureau was established in the Palisade Avenue Firehouse. Thirty-eight fire alarm boxes and forty miles of telegraph wire made up the alarm system.

1900s-1910s

In 1900, the YFD responded to their first mutual aid response to the Village of Bronxville. In June of that year, funds were acquired to convert two volunteer firehouses and an old police department horse stable into paid firehouses. Plans for a new firehouse on Oak Street were completed. On May 1, 1901, two new firehouses on Radford Street (Station/Engine 4) and Shonnard Place (Station/Engine 5) were occupied. On September 16 of that year, Station/Engine 3 was placed into service on Riverdale Avenue. On August 4, 1902, twenty new firemen were appointed to form Station/Engine 6 on Oak Street and to form Station/Engine 7 at 456 Central Park Avenue. In 1907, Station/Engine 8 was established at 268 Woodworth Avenue, and Truck Co. 3 was in service at Station/Engine 5 Firehouse at 53 Shonnard Place. On December 22, 1909, Station/Engine 9 was placed into service on Swain Street (Pondfield Road West) with three additional firemen. That same year, the Yonkers Fire Department tested a motorized fire engine.

In May 1910, two motorized hose wagons were placed into service at Engine Co. 6 and Engine Co. 8. On November 5 of that year, Station/Engine 10 was placed into service at Saw Mill River Road with Engine Co. 8's former apparatus. The first motorized pumping engine arrived in 1911 and was placed into service at Engine Co. 5. In 1912, a two shift system was enacted so firemen could work shorter hours. In 1913, the Telegraph Bureau, now composed of over 150 fire alarm boxes and over 100 miles of telegraph wire, along with the Fire Chief's office was moved to City Hall. That same year, the YFD's first motorized ladder truck arrived from the American LaFrance company. The Chief of Department and two Assistant Chiefs were also given automobiles. By the end of 1913, eight pieces of fire apparatus were motorized. In 1914, Truck Co. 4 was placed into service at the Station 4 Radford Street Firehouse. By 1916, the entire Yonkers Fire Department was motorized, and the department had over 126 firemen.

1920s—1930s
In 1921, Station/Engine 11 was constructed at 433 Bronxville Road. Truck Company 3 was moved from Station 5 (53 Shonnard Place) to Station 11. By August 1921, the YFD had grown to 10 Engine Companies and four Truck Companies. Many new fire stations were built to replace older ones. In 1927, construction was completed on the New Fire Headquarters/Station 1 at 5-7 New School Street. This new four-bay, four-story structure, replaced the old Palisades Avenue Fire Headquarters and also served as the location for Training and Administrative Operations. On March 30, 1930, Rescue Co. 1 was formed at Fire Headquarters/Station 1. Station/Engine Co. 12 was placed into service in June of that year at 75 Fortfield Avenue. In 1931, a new Station/Engine 7 was constructed at 441 Central Park Avenue. On January 5, 1932, Truck Co. 5 was placed into service and quartered at the new Station 7. In 1933, Station/Engine Co. 8 moved to 539 Warburton Avenue.

1940s—1950s
With the start of World War II, an auxiliary force of civilian firefighters was trained by the Fire Department in firefighting procedures in case of an enemy attack. The auxiliary firemen numbered about five hundred. These men were assigned to firehouses near their homes. They were disbanded when the war ended. During the war, several companies were removed from active service. Station/Engine Co. 5 at 53 Shonnard Place was put out of commission on February 1, 1942.  Station 9 on Swain Street closed and Engine 9 moved to 53 Shonnard Place and was renamed Station 9. Also, Rescue Co. 1 and Truck Co. 5 were removed from service on February 1, 1942. Both were returned to service on April 19, 1943, but Truck Co. 5 was placed out of service again until February 17, 1946. In August 1946, the Yonkers Fire Department was 50 years old and consisted of 17 paid fire companies. Also in the 1940s two-way radios were put in place in the assistant chief's cars and Rescue Co. 1.

In January 1956, the YFD was divided into two divisions: the East Division and the West Division. Each was commanded by an assistant chief who oversaw a group of five or six firehouses. A new firehouse (Station 13) was built in 1956 at 340 Kimball Avenue, and on March 27 of that year, Truck Co. 6 was placed into service there. On August 13, 1956, Engine Co. 13 was also placed into service at Station 13 on Kimball Avenue. On December 1, 1958, a new firehouse, Station/Engine 14, was built at 2187 Central Park Avenue. On September 29, 1959, the Telegraph/Fire Dispatch Bureau was relocated to Station/Engine 12.

In the 1950s and early 1960s, the Yonkers Fire Department purchased new pumpers to replace the entire "Pre-War" fleet. There were five American LaFrance 700-800 series pumpers and nine Ward LaFrance pumpers purchased between 1956 and 1963. The American LaFrance rigs were one 1956 700 Series Pumper and four 800 Series Pumpers (two 1956 and two 1958). The difference being the pump panel on the officer's side on the 700s and on the 800s having it on the chauffeur's side. The Ward LaFrance pumpers were six Fire Balls (two each in 1957, 1958, and 1960).

1960s—1970s
On March 13, 1961, Truck Co. 5 was moved from Station/Engine 7, to Station/Engine 12, on Fortfield Avenue. On September 1, 1961, the department acquired its own radio system. Also in 1961, YFD took delivery of a Mack B/Gerstenslager Walk-In Heavy Duty Rescue Apparatus running as Rescue Company 1 out of Fire Headquarters-Station 1. Two 1961 Ward LaFrance Fire Brands Pumpers were purchased (One assigned to Engine Co.7 and Engine Co. 8). In 1963, Yonkers Fire Department purchased one Ward LaFrance MarkII/Ambassador Pumper, which originally started at Engine Co. 1, before moving over to Engine Co. 2 in 1967 and then in 1971 as Engine Co. 3, before being destroyed in an accident. After the accident, the roof of the Ward LaFrance MarkII/Ambassador was cut and placed on top of the Ward LaFrance Fire Brand assigned to Engine Co. 7. In March of 1967, the Yonkers Fire Department took delivery of a New Mack C Pumper that was assigned to Engine Co. 1 at Station 1/Fire Headquarters. Later in 1967, the Yonkers Fire Department took delivery of an American LaFrance 900 Series 100ft Mid Mount Aerial Truck, that was assigned to Truck Co. 1 at Station 1/Fire Headquarters. On December 21, 1967, Truck Co. 7 was organized and placed into service at Station/Engine 14. In 1968, Yonkers FD took delivery of an additional Mack C Pumper, which was assigned to Engine Co. 4 on Radford Street. On July 31, 1970, the YFD acquired the Bureau of Combustibles. In 1971, the YFD turned 75 and consisted of 13 Engine Companies, 7 Truck Companies, 1 Rescue Company, and a force of 405 uniformed firemen.

Below were the Fire Station/Company Assignments on January 1, 1971:

In 1971, all engine companies had 1000 gallons per minute (gpm) pumps and all truck companies had 100 foot aerial ladder devices. The Fire Alarm system consisted of 875 Fire Alarm Boxes and 40 miles of underground cable and over 130 miles of above-ground wire. In January 1971, Station 3 at 81 Riverdale Avenue was closed as part of the Riverdale Avenue Arterial Construction Project. Engine Co. 3 was temporarily moved to, and quartered in, Station 1/Fire Headquarters until the New Station Station 3 Firehouse on Vark Street was opened on August 17, 1971. On March 16, 1972, Truck Co. 2 was moved from Station 2 on Vineyard Avenue to Station 9 on Shonnard Place. At the beginning of 1973, the YFD fought for the inclusion of an officer on each piece of fire apparatus. In 1974, the Yonkers Fire Department took delivery of its very first tower ladder platform truck (Tower Ladder 1) replacing Truck 1 at Fire Headquarters/Station 1. It was a 1974 Mack Baker 75' Tower Ladder.  On December 23, 1974, the first "handi-talkie" two-way radios were distributed. A year later, in 1975, the Fire Investigation Unit was established. On March 10, 1975, each Truck Company's number designation was changed to match the number of the Engine Company it was quartered with. Thus, Truck Co.'s 1, 2, 3, 4, 5, 6, and 7 became Truck Co.'s 1, 9, 11, 4, 12, 13, and 14. On April 16, 1975, two Assistant Chiefs were detailed as "Executive Assistant Chiefs". One was responsible for Fire Suppression and the other for Staff Operations. This detail was made permanent in September of that year. A third Executive Assistant Chief was added in 1976 and made responsible for fire prevention, fire investigation, and safety and training. The following year the title "Executive Assistant Chief" was changed to "Deputy Chief". On April 30, 1975, to mark the end of the Vietnam War, each piece of Yonkers Fire Department Apparatus, was brought out onto their respective outside aprons and ran their lights and sirens for one minute.

Starting in 1973, the Yonkers Fire Department began the first of several upgrades to its Front Line Engine Company Apparatus Fleet, with the purchase of 3 - RED 1973 Mack CF's. They were assigned to Engine Company #'s 1, 6, and 9. 

Due to a financial crisis in the City of Yonkers, on January 1, 1976, Engine Co. 1, Truck Co. 11 (formally Truck Co. 3), and Rescue Co. 1 were decommissioned from service. Engine Co. 1 (which was quartered at YFD Headquarters/Station 1) and Truck Co. 11 (which was quartered at YFD Station 11) were never returned to front line service. Rescue Co. 1  remained decommissioned from front line service for 24 years until March 6, 2000, when it was recommissioned. 

On November 23, 1976, the YFD adopted the 10-Code system, similar to the one used by the New York City Fire Department, for radio communications.

With Engine 1 being decommissioned, its 1973 Mack CF was assigned to Engine Co. # 8. Then in early 1976, the Yonkers Fire Department took delivery of 5 more Mack CF's, but these were painted and arrived as LIME Green Pumpers. 1 was a 1975 Mack CF, and the other 4 were 1976 Mack CF's. These 5 Mack CF's were assigned to Engine Companies # 3, 6, 9, 10 and 13, with the 1975 Mack CF going to Engine Co. 10. With this assignment, the Yonkers Fire Department subsequently moved the 2 remaining RED 1973 Mack CF's from Engine Co. 6 and 9 over to Engine Company 4 and 12 respectfully. Then in 1978 one more additional Mack CF Lime Green Pumper was purchased, and it was assigned to Engine Company # 2. 

On March 10, 1978, the fire apparatus numbering was changed to conform with the numbering system of Westchester County, New York. In order to eliminate confusion during mutual aid, all fire apparatus in Westchester County were given different numbers. YFD Engine Companies received numbers in the 300's and YFD Truck Companies received numbers in the 70's. It was at that time, that Truck Companies were now known as "Ladder" Companies. Thus Engine Company 2, 3, 4, 6, 7, 8, 9, 10, 11, 12, 13, and 14 became Engine 302, 303, 304, 306, 307, 308, 309, 310, 311, 312, 313, and 314 respectfully and Truck Company 1, 9, 4, 12, 13, and 14 became Ladder Company 71, 72, 74, 75, 73, and 70 respectfully (Spare/Reserve Engine Companies were assigned as Engine 300, 301, 305, 315, 316, 317, 318, 319, and 320; along with Spare/Reserve Ladder Companies 68, 69, 76, 77, 78, 79, 80 and 81).

On October 19, 1979, under the new apparatus numbering, Engine Co. 305 was commissioned and placed into Front Line service at Station 2 on Vineyard Avenue, while Ladder Co. 76 was commissioned and placed into Front Line service at Station 11 on Bronxville Road, the quarters of Engine Co. 311 (formerly Engine Co. 11).

In 1979, the Yonkers Fire Department were running as their Front Line Apparatus, the following Engine Companies - Engine Co. 302 (1978 Mack CF); Engine Co. 303 (1976 Mack CF); Engine Company 304 (1973 Mack CF); Engine Company 305 (1971 American LaFrance); Engine Co. 306 (1976 Mack CF), Engine Co. 307 (1967 Mack C); Engine Co. 308 (1973 Mack CF); Engine Co. 309 (1976 Mack CF); Engine Co. 310 (1975 Mack CF), Engine Co. 311 (1968 Mack C); Engine Co. 312 (1973 Mack CF); Engine Co. 313 (1976 Mack CF); and Engine Co. 314 (1961 Ward LaFrance Fire Brand). In addition, the Yonkers Fire Department was running as their Front Line Apparatus the following Ladder Companies - Ladder Co. 70 (1967 American LaFrance "Red Cab" Mid Mount); Ladder Co. 71 (1979 American LaFrance Century Tiller); Ladder Co. 72 (1979 Mack/ALF Mid Mount); Ladder Co. 73 (1979 American LaFrance Century Tiller [aka: "Supertrain"]; Ladder Co. 74 (1979 American LaFrance Century Tiller); Ladder Co. 75 (1975 American LaFrance Rear Mount); Ladder Co. 76 (1974 American LaFrance "White Cab" Mid Mount).

1980s
In 1980, a new Station 8, located at 571 Warburton Avenue, was opened. It replaced the old carriage house Station 8, located at 607 Warburton Avenue. On July 17, 1980, all Fire Alarm Boxes were removed from street corners, as the city deemed it too costly to repair the system.  On August 18, 1980, Ladder Co. 76 was moved from Station 11 to Station 3 on 96 Vark Street. On September 15, 1980, Station 2 (quarters of Engine Co. 302 and Engine Co. 305) on Vineyard Avenue was permanently closed due to structural issues. Because of this, Engine Co. 302 was relocated to Station 9 and Engine Co. 305 was relocated to Station 1-Fire Headquarters on New School Street. In December 1980, the title of Chief of Department was replaced with the position of "Fire Commissioner".

On April 16, 1981, Yonkers Fire Department Union local 628 employees (approximately 410 firefighters and officers) walked off the job due to a contract dispute. The strike lasted two days.

On April 19, 1982, due to another financial crisis within the City of Yonkers, Engine Co.'s 302, 305, and 311, as well as Ladder Co. 76 were all decommissioned and removed from front line service (Engine 305 and Ladder 76 would never be returned to front line service). Due to these changes, Ladder Co. 70 was moved from Station 14 to Station 11 to provide coverage in the Cedar Knolls section of the city.

In June 1983, Engine Co. 302 and Engine Co. 311 were recommissioned, with Engine 302 quartered at Station 1/Fire Headquarters. However, one month later both companies were decommissioned once again — Engine 302 would never to return to front line service (The 1978 Mack CF Pumper that was assigned to Engine 302 at the time, was re-assigned to Engine Company 304). 

Also in 1983 the Communications Office (Telegraph Bureau) was moved from Station 12 to 10 St. Casimir Avenue.

In 1984, Engine Co. 311 was once again recommissioned and reactivated at Station 11, and the Battalion Aides were assigned once again to each Battalion Chief. In addition, Ladder Co. 70 was moved from Station 11, back to the Station 14, the quarters of Engine Co. 314.

1990s
In 1990, the Department recognized the need to begin to develop a special unit to cope with the rise in hazardous materials (HAZMAT) incidents as well as to comply with new Occupational Safety and Health Administration (OSHA) regulations, which specifically detailed the training requirements for personnel handling them. Initially all line officers and firefighters were trained to the HAZMAT Operations level, while a team of six officers received additional training to the Technician level. These six officers provided 24/7 coverage on more serious hazardous materials incidents while maintaining positions in Engine or Ladder companies. Subsequently, the department felt that it needed to create, as part of its overall structure, the YFD Special Operations Division. This new division of the Yonkers Fire Department would house the majority of, and maintain, all YFD Special Operations Apparatus and Equipment that would supplement all First Line Companies. YFD Special Operations Apparatus are activated at major incidents such as weapons of mass destruction (WMD) or hazardous materials incidents, or for a trench or building collapse. The YFD Collapse Unit, part of the YFD Special Operations Division, would be quartered at YFD Station 11 on Bronxville Road, with the crew of Engine 311 used to staff the unit should it be needed. The YFD Special Operations division also oversees all Reserve Apparatus, making sure that they are fully equipped and ready to be placed into service whenever they are needed, as well as all Spare Apparatus. The YFD Special Operations Division was established and originally located within a city owned building. This was located at a vacant facility up at the original Ridge Hill Property, between the New York State Thruway and the Sprain Brook Parkway, where they were able to conduct all specialized training needed for their operation.

Also in 1990, the City of Yonkers outfitted all firefighters with new OSHA-approved protective gear. In 1991, the Safety Division was instituted and manned with a full-time Incident Safety Officer. They responded to all structure fires and supported the health and safety needs of the firefighters. The position is now known as the "Safety Battalion".

Beginning in 1991, all probationary firefighters were trained as Certified First Responders. Many senior department members also opted at that time to receive medical training and became New York State Certified first responders, emergency medical technicians and paramedics. Also in 1992, the communication office of Fire, Police and EMS was moved to the Cacace Justice Center and an enhanced 911 emergency response system was instituted.

On June 18, 1992, a hazardous materials unit, designated as Squad Co. 1, was commissioned and located at Fire Headquarters. The unit was also used as a quasi-rescue company assisting ladder companies at all working fires. During 1993, all members assigned to the unit received extra training and were certified by New York State to the Hazardous Materials Specialist level. Support companies were designated to assist the Squad when more than two people were needed to handle an incident. In 1995, a Computer Aided Dispatch (CAD) system was installed in the communications center.

In 1996, the Yonkers Fire Department celebrated its 100 Anniversary. The designations of the Assistant Chiefs of the East and West Divisions, formerly known as Division Chief 1 and Division Chief 2, were changed to Battalion Chief's 1 and 2, with the East and West Division becoming Battalion's 1 and 2. Additionally, civilian employees were hired to replace firefighters in the Dispatch Office. Also, the Fire Department Repair Shop, formerly located at Station 7, the quarters of Engine Co. 307, was moved to the Departmen of Public Works (DPW) Repair Shop located at 1130 Nepperhan Avenue.

2000 to 2009 
On March 6, 2000, Squad Co. 1 was decommissioned and re-organized as Rescue Co. 1 at Fire Headquarters (Station 1). Thus, Rescue 1 was back in service as a front line company 24 years after it was decommissioned on January 1, 1976.

In 2004, Engine Co. 311 was deactivated from service at Station 11 and Squad Co. 11 was subsequently commissioned and placed into service at Station 11 (along with the YFD Collapse Unit). Squad Co. 11 operates as an engine company for its first due area, Cedar Knolls. When called upon, it also attends most second alarm fires in other areas of the City of Yonkers when they are not part of the first alarm assignment. In addition, they are responsible for manning the Collapse Unit when it is called upon. Finally, Squad Co. 11 responds in place of Rescue Co. 1, should Rescue Co. 1 not be available, and supports Rescue Co. 1 for all HAZMAT and urban search and rescue (USAR) assignments.

In 2007, in conjunction with the City of Yonkers selling the Ridge Hill Property for commercial development, the Yonkers Fire Department Special Operations Division was moved from their Ridge Hill Facility/Operation to their current location at 460 Nepperhan Avenue.

On September 7, 2007, the first female firefighter, Lianne Navedo, was appointed to the Yonkers Fire Department and was assigned to Squad Co. 11.

2010 to 2019 
 
On June 28, 2010, due to another financial crisis in the City of Yonkers, the Safety Battalion was removed from service. Now, for all 10-30 alarms called in the next available Battalion Chief would respond to the scene, becoming the Safety Battalion at the incident.

In 2012, the third and fourth floors of the Yonkers Fire Headquarters/Station 1 on 5-7 School Street were deemed unsafe. Both the executive offices of the Yonkers Fire Department and the offices of Local 628 Yonkers Firefighters Union, that had been located on these floors, were moved to a new facility on 470 Nepperhan Avenue.

On June 5, 2015, the Building Department of the City of Yonkers determined that the entire Station 1 (Former Yonkers Fire Headquarters) was unsafe and condemned it. Subsequently, Tower Ladder Company 71 was moved to the quarters of Station 3 on 96 Vark Street. Rescue Company 1 was subsequently moved to the quarters of Station 8 on 571 Warburton Avenue. Mask Service Unit # 1 was moved to the quarters of Station 9 at 53 Shonnard Place.

On July 30, 2015, Rescue Company 1 was moved from Station 8 on 571 Warburton Avenue to Station 7 on 441 Central Park Avenue and Spare Ladder 76 was moved from Station 7 to Station 8.

In July 2017, the City of Yonkers agreed on plans to build a new four-bay Station 1 on the corner of New School Street, Palisades Avenue, Elm Street, and Engine Place. Construction is anticipated to be completed in late 2019/early 2020.

In October 2019, the City of Yonkers, in a ceremony held just outside the site of the New YFD Station 1, that was still under construction, dedicated and renamed the section of New School Street, between Palisades Avenue/Elm Street and Engine Place, as "FF Patrick Joyce Way" in memory of Firefighter Joyce, of YFD Rescue Co. # 1, who tragically lost his life, battling a fire in 2009.

In November 2019, due to remodeling/construction work on-going at both Station 10 and Station 13, Engine 310 is temporarily being quartered at Station 12 with Engine 312, Tower Ladder 75, and Battalion 2. Engine 313 is temporarily quartered at Station 11 with Squad 11 and the Collapse Rig and Ladder 73 is temporarily quartered at Station 7 with Engine 307. Also, Rescue 1 has temporarily been relocated back to Station 8 with Engine 308.

In December 2019, Engine 313 and Ladder 73 moved back to Station 13 and Engine 310 moved back to Station 10, as the construction work was completed at their respective stations. Rescue 1 moved back, temporarily, to Station 7.

On December 18, 2019, there was the Ribbon Cutting Ceremony opening the New Yonkers Fire Department Station 1 located at 25 John Street. Several articles from both the Yonkers Fire Department and the Yonkers School System were gathered to be placed in a Time Capsule which will be buried below the New Bell Tower located outside of the new station, which is scheduled to be opened in the Year 2119.

2020 to Present 
Tower Ladder 71 and Rescue 1 moved back to their new YFD Fire Station # 1 on Monday, April 6, 2020, marking the first time that these 2 companies would be located together since 2015, when the former Station 1 was closed.

As of 2020, the Yonkers Fire Department operates out of 11 fire stations, with 10 Engine Companies, six Ladder Companies, one Squad Company(rescue-pumper), and one Rescue Company.

In 2021, the Yonkers Fire Department welcomed their first African-American Female Firefighter, Fatima Taylor.

Department companies 1896-2022
Engine Companies

Engine Company 1 - Commissioned on September 1, 1896; 18 Palisade Avenue – Fire Headquarters. 
Moved in October 1928 to 5-7 New School Street – Newly Constructed Fire Headquarters/Station 1. 
De-Commissioned on January 1, 1976

Engine Company 2 – Commissioned in October 1897; 7-9 Vineyard Avenue - Station 2. 
On March 10, 1978, Engine 2 was Re-Designated as Engine Company 302. 
On September 15, 1980; Station 2 was condemned and closed and subsequently Engine 302 was moved to Station 9. 
De-Commissioned on April 19, 1982. 
Was Re-Commissioned  in June 1983 and was quartered at Fire Headquarters/Station 1.  
De-Commissioned in July 1983

Engine Company 3 – Commissioned on September 16, 1901; 81 Riverdale Avenue – Station 3.  
In January 1971, Station 3 at 81 Riverdale Avenue was closed and Engine 3 was moved temporarily to Fire Headquarters/Station 1, 5-7 New School Street. 
On August 17, 1971, Engine 3 was moved to 96 Vark Street, the Newly Constructed Station 3. 
On March 10, 1978  was Re-Designated as Engine Company 303 ---   
As of August 2018, apparatus is currently using a 2015 Ferrara Ultra Pumper.

Engine Company 4 – Commissioned on May 1, 1901; 36 Radford Street – Station 4. 
On March 10, 1978  was Re-Designated as Engine Company 304 ---  
As of August 2018, apparatus is currently using a 2015 Ferrara Ultra Pumper.

Engine Company 5 – Commissioned on May 1, 1901; 53 Shonnard Place – Station 5 (which was Re-Designated as Station 9 in 1942).  
Was De-Commissioned on February 1, 1942

Engine Company 6 – Commissioned on August 4, 1902; 81 Oak Street - Station 6. 
On March 10, 1978 was Re-Designated as Engine Company 306 --- 
As of August 2018, apparatus is currently using a 2010 American LaFrance Eagle Pumper.

Engine Company 7 – Commissioned on August 4, 1902; Central Park Avenue/Yonkers Avenue – Station 7. 
1931 Moved to newly constructed Station 7 Firehouse at 441 Central Park Avenue – Station 7
On March 10, 1978 was Re-Designated as Engine Co. 307 ---
As of August 2018, apparatus is currently using a 2017 Ferrara Ultra Pumper

Engine Company 8 – Commissioned on August 15, 1907; 268 Woodworth Avenue – Station 8. 
1933 moved to 583 Warburton Avenue - Station 8 (a former carriage house). 
On March 10, 1978 was Re-Designated as Engine Company 308. 
In June 1980 was moved to 573 Warburton Avenue – to the Newly Constructed Station 8. --- 
As of August 2018, apparatus is currently using a 2010 American LaFrance Eagle Pumper

Engine Company 9 – Commissioned on December 22, 1909; Swain Street (Pondfield Road West) – Station 9. 
In 1922 was moved to 53 Shonnard Place - Station 5 (Re-Designated as Station 9 in 1942). 
On March 10, 1978 was Re-Designated as Engine Company 309  ---
As of August 2018, apparatus is currently using a 2010 Spartan/Smeal Pumper

Engine Company 10 – Commissioned on November 5, 1910; 485 Saw Mill River Road
On March 10, 1978 was Re-Designated as Engine Company 310 --- 
As of September 2018, apparatus is currently using a 2018 Ferrara Ultra Pumper

Engine Company 11 – Commissioned on January 9, 1922; 427 Bronxville Road – Station 11. 
On March 10, 1978 was Re-Designated as Engine Company 311. 
De-Commissioned on April 19, 1982. 
Re-Commissioned in June 1983 at Station 11. 
De-Commissioned in July 1983. 
Re-Commissioned January 2, 1984 at Station 11. 
De-Commissioned December 1, 2004 (see commissioning of Squad 11 below).

Engine Company 12 - Commissioned on June 17, 1930; 75 Fortfield Avenue – Station 12. 
On March 10, 1978  was Re-Designated as Engine Company 312 --- 
As of August 2018, apparatus is currently using a 2017 Ferrara Ultra Pumper

Engine Company 13 – Commissioned on August 13, 1956; 340 Kimball Avenue – Station 13. 
On March 10, 1978 was Re-Designated as Engine Company 313 --- 
As of August 2018, apparatus is currently using a 2017 Ferrara Ultra Pumper

Engine Company 14 – Commissioned on December 1, 1958; 2187 Central Park Avenue - Station 14. 
On March 10, 1978 was Re-Designated as Engine Company 314 ---
As of August 2018, apparatus is currently using a 2017 Ferrara Ultra Pumper

Truck Companies/Ladder Companies

Truck Company 1 – Commissioned on September 1, 1896; 18 Palisade Avenue - Headquarters. 
Moved in October 1928 to 5-7 New School Street – Newly Constructed Fire Headquarters/Station 1. 
On March 10, 1978 was Re-Designated as Ladder 71 (now Tower Ladder Company 71).  
Temporarily moved on June 5, 2015 from YFD Fire Headquarters/Station 1 to Station 3 - 96 Vark Street. ---
As of August 2018, apparatus is currently using a 2015 Ferrara Inferno 75 ft. Tower Ladder

Truck Company 2 – Commissioned in October 1897; 7-9 Vineyard Avenue – Station 2. 
On March 16, 1972 was moved from Station 2 to 53 Shonnard Place - Station 9.
On March 10, 1975 was Re-designated as Truck Company 9. 
On March 10, 1978 was Re-designated as Ladder Company 72 --- 
As of August 2018, apparatus is currently using a 2010 Spartan/Smeal 100 ft. Rear Mount Ladder

Truck Company 3 – Commissioned on 1907; 53 Shonnard Place - Station 5.  
In 1922 was moved to 433 Bronxville Road - Station 11. 
On March 10, 1975 was Re-designated as Truck Company 11. 
Was De-Commissioned on January 1, 1976. 
Was Re-Commissioned on October 19, 1979 as Ladder Company 76 at 433 Bronxville Road; Station 11. 
On August 18, 1980 was moved from Station 11 to Station 3 on 96 Vark Street.   
Was De-Commissioned on April 19, 1982

Truck Company 4 – Commissioned in late 1914; 36 Radford Street – Station 4. 
On March 10, 1978 was Re-designated as Ladder Company 74 --- 
As of August 2018, apparatus is currently using a 2017 Ferrara Inferno 100 ft. Rear Mount Ladder

Truck Company 5 – Commissioned on January 5, 1932; 441 Central Park Avenue - Station 7
Was De-Commissioned on February 1, 1942. 
Was Re-Commissioned on April 19, 1943. 
Was De-Commissioned between 1944 and 1946. 
Was Re-Commissioned on February 17, 1946. 
On March 31, 1961 was moved from Station 7 to 75 Fortfield Avenue - Station 12. 
On March 10, 1975 as Re-designated as Truck Company 12. 
On March 10, 1978 was Re-designated as Ladder Company 75 (now Tower Ladder Company 75) --- 
As of August 2018, apparatus is currently using a 2017 Ferrara Inferno 75 ft. Tower Ladder

Truck Company 6 – Commissioned on March 27, 1956; 340 Kimball Avenue – Station 13. 
On March 10, 1975 was Re-designated as Truck Company 13. 
On March 10, 1978 was Re-designated as Ladder Company 73 --- 
As of August 2022, apparatus is currently using a 2022 Ferrara Inferno 102' Rear Mount Ladder

Truck Company 7 – Commissioned on December 21, 1967; 2187 Central Park Avenue - Station 14. 
On March 10, 1975 was Re-designated as Truck Company 14. 
On March 10, 1978 was Re-designated as Ladder Company 70. 
On April 19, 1982 was Reassigned to Station 11. 
On January 1, 1984 was Reassigned back to Station 14. ---  
As of October 2022, apparatus is currently using a 2022 Ferrara Inferno 102' Rear Mount Ladder

Rescue Company 1/Squad Company 1/Squad Company 11/Engine Company 305

Rescue Company 1 – Commissioned on March 3, 1930; 5-7 New School Street - Fire Headquarters/Station 1. 
Was De-Commissioned on February 1, 1942. 
Was Re-Commissioned on April 19, 1943. 
Was De-Commissioned on January 1, 1976. 
Was Re-Commissioned on March 6, 2000; Fire Headquarters/Station 1. 
Was Temporarily moved on June 5, 2015 from Fire Headquarters/Station 1 to Station 8 - 573 Warburton Avenue.
Was Temporarily moved again on July 30, 2015 from Station 8 - 573 Warburton Avenue to Station 7 - 441 Central Park Avenue. --- 
As of August 2018, apparatus is currently using a 2007 American LaFrance Eagle Heavy Rescue

Engine Company 305 - Commissioned on October 19, 1979; 5-7 Vineyard Avenue – Station 2. It functioned similar to a Squad company. 
On September 15, 1980 was relocated from Station 2 to Fire Headquarters/Station 1. 
Was De-Commissioned on April 19, 1982

Squad Company 1 – Commissioned on June 18, 1992; 5-7 New School Street - Fire Headquarters/Station 1 
Was De-Commissioned on March 6, 2000 (see recommissioning of Rescue Co. 1)

Squad Company 11 – Commissioned on December 1, 2004; 433 Bronxville Road  - Station 11 (see decommissioning of Engine Co. 11/Engine Co. 311) --- 
As of November 2022, apparatus is currently using a 2022 Ferrara Inferno MVP Rescue Pumper

YFD Station History 1896-2021

Department chiefs and commissioners 1896-2021
Chief of Department

James J. Mulcahey  – August 27, 1896, to December 23, 1931

Arthur Chambers – December 24, 1931, to November 20, 1936

John J. Reilly – January 31, 1937, to December 22, 1939

Daniel Carnegie – December 30, 1939, to April 30, 1942

Edward H. Siller – May 1, 1942, to January 16, 1945

William C. Garvin – January 16, 1945, to August 18, 1958

Andrew Gerlock – July 22, 1959, to October 25, 1974

Wallace J. Brown – October 25, 1974, to July 1, 1979

Fire Commissioners

Richard Smith – July 1, 1979, to July 6, 1983

William McLaughlin – June 20, 1983, to July 7, 1989

Edward T. Dunn – January 18, 1990, to January 31, 1992

Neil V. Curry – February 14, 1992, to February 9, 1995

Thomas J. Lorio – April 19, 1995, to January 13, 1999

Peter S. Guyett – April 7, 1999, to June 6, 2002

Anthony Pagano – June 7, 2002, to December 31, 2011

George Kielb – January 1, 2012, to June 28, 2012

Charles Gardner – June 29, 2012, to August 30, 2012

Robert Sweeney – August 31, 2012, to August 23, 2014

John Darcy - August 24, 2014, to June 4, 2016

Robert Sweeney - June 5, 2016, to March 10, 2021

John Folkerts - March 11, 2021 to June 14, 2021

Anthony Pagano - June 14, 2021 to Present

Organization
As of 2018, the City of Yonkers Fire Department is subdivided into three main divisions: Operations, Personnel, and Fire Prevention. Each division is commanded by a deputy chief.

Operations Division
The Operations Division provides firefighting and emergency medical services. It consists of two firefighting battalions, the Marine Unit (Fire Boat), Fire Repair Shop, Fire Communications, and the Special Operations Unit.

The current Deputy Chief of Operations is John Folkerts.

The Fire and Emergency Response services staff consists of a deputy chief, 13 battalion chiefs, 31 captains, 75 lieutenants, 314 firefighters, and one civilian employee. The Fire Communications Office's staff consists of a lieutenant and one firefighter.

Personnel Division
The Deputy Chief of Personnel is responsible for Personnel, Training, Labor/Management Relations, Planning and Development and Manpower. The current Deputy Chief of Personnel is Joseph Citrone.

Currently in the Personnel Division, there are four subdivisions, each with its own staff. The Administrative Office's staff consists of a fire commissioner/chief of department, a deputy chief, a captain, and seven civilian employees.

Fire Prevention Division
The Deputy Chief of Fire Prevention is responsible for managing the Fire Prevention Division, the Fire Investigation Unit and Fire Safety Education. This includes overseeing the inspection of existing buildings and those under construction or renovation, processing all complaints or inquires and enforcement of New York State Fire and Building Codes, investigation of the cause and origin of all fires of consequence, and fire safety education programs for the citizens of the city. The current Deputy Chief of Fire Prevention is Christopher DeSantis.

The Fire Prevention, Education, and Safety Education Unit staff consists of a deputy chief, a captain, two lieutenants, seven firefighters, and a civilian employee.

Operations

The Yonkers Fire Department currently operates out of 12 firehouses, located throughout the city, in two battalions, under the command of a Deputy Chief of Operations. Each battalion is commanded by an Assistant Chief on each shift. The Yonkers Fire Department operates ten engine companies, six ladder companies,  one rescue company, one squad company (rescue pumper), and numerous Special, Support, and Reserve Units. Each front line piece of fire apparatus is staffed by a crew of three firefighters and one fire officer for each shift.

In addition to the front line fire apparatus, the YFD operates a number of special and support units, as well as historical units and reserve units, most of which are located at the Special Operations and Storage Facility. Also, the YFD operates an extensive fleet of Spare and Reserve fire apparatus. All spare fire apparatus are unequipped and are put into service when front line fire apparatus are taken out of service for maintenance. All reserve apparatus are readily equipped to be placed into service as callback units, staffed by off-duty callback personnel when needed.

In addition to the twelve firehouses, the YFD also operates a repair shop.

Current Stations and Apparatus
Below is a complete listing of all YFD fire station locations and fire companies, by battalion, in the city of Yonkers. Each piece of front line apparatus is staffed with a minimum of four firefighters, including a driver and an officer.

APPARATUS ROSTER

All pump/tank measurements are in US gallons.
Shop numbers in brackets.

1ST BATTALION / WEST SIDE BATTALION

FIRE STATION 1 - 7 NEW SCHOOL STREET (GETTY SQUARE) - Built 2019

Tower Ladder 71 - 2015 Ferrara Inferno HD85 (-/-/75' mid-mount platform) (SN#H-5570) 

Rescue 1 - 2007 American LaFrance Eagle walk-around

Tower Ladder 81 (Spare) (8-12) - 2008 American LaFrance Eagle (-/-/75' LTI mid-mount) (Ex-Tower Ladder 75) 

Rescue 2 (Spare) - 2000 American LaFrance walk-around (Ex-Rescue 1)

FIRE STATION 3 - 96 VARK STREET (GETTY SQUARE) - Built 1972

Engine 303 (4151) - 2015 Ferrara Ultra (1050/500) (SN#H-5425)

Battalion 1 - 2019 Ford Expedition 4x4 / Proliner

FIRE STATION 4 - 36 RADFORD STREET (PARK HILL / LUDLOW) - Built 1913

Engine 304 (4152) - 2015 Ferrara Ultra (1000/500) (SN#H-5426) (Ex-Engine 313)

Ladder 74 (4174) - 2017 Ferrara Inferno LP102 (-/-/102' rear-mount) (SN#H-5958)

FIRE STATION 6 - 81 OAK STREET (NODINE HILL) - Built 1902/1962

Engine 306 (105) - 2010 American LaFrance Eagle (1000/500)

FIRE STATION 8 - 571 WARBURTON AVENUE (GLENWOOD / NORTHWEST) - Built 1980

Engine 308 (106) - 2010 American LaFrance Eagle (1000/500)

Marine Unit 11 (Fireboat 1) - Boat

Ladder 76 (Spare) (020) - 2002 HME / Smeal (-/-/100' rear-mount) (Ex-Ladder 73)

Engine 298 (Historical) 1991 Mack CF / Ward / 1992 Interstate (1000/500) (Ex-Engine 306) (Last and final Mack CF built)

FIRE STATION 9 - 53 SHONNARD PLACE (NORTHWEST) - Built 1916

Engine 309 (101) - 2010 Spartan Gladiator / Smeal (1500/500)

Ladder 72 (100) - 2010 Spartan Gladiator / Smeal UT100 (-/-/100' rear-mount)

2ND BATTALION - EAST SIDE BATTALION

FIRE STATION 7 - 441 CENTRAL PARK AVENUE (LINCOLN PARK) - Built 1931

Engine 307 (4171) - 2017 Ferrara Ultra (2000/500) (SN#H-5950)

Ladder 78 (Reserve) - 2007 HME / Smeal (-/-/100' rear-mount) (Ex-Ladder 74)

Car 6 (Fire Investigation Unit) (085) - 2006 Chevrolet Tahoe 4x4

FIRE STATION 10 - 573 SAW MILL RIVER ROAD (NEPPERHAN) - Built 1909

Engine 310 (4071) - 2018 Ferrara Ultra (1000/500) (SN#H-6318)

FIRE STATION 11 - 433 BRONXVILLE ROAD (CENTUCK / LAWRENCE PARK/ ARMOUR VILLA) - Built 1921

Squad 11 (4220) - 2022 Ferrara Inferno MVP Rescue Pumper (2250 GPM Waterous® two-stage pump

Collapse Rescue Unit - 2008 Mack Terra-Pro / Hackney walk-around

FIRE STATION 12 - 75 FORTFIELD AVENUE (BRYN MAWR / DUNWOODIE) - Built 1930

Engine 312 (4172) - 2017 Ferrara Ultra (2000/500) (SN#H-5951)

Tower Ladder 75 (4175) - 2017 Ferrara Inferno (-/-/75' mid-mount platform) (SN#H-5957)

Battalion 2 - 2019 Ford Expedition 4x4 / Proliner

Engine 300 (LDH Hose Wagon) (063) - 2005 American LaFrance Eagle (1000/500) (Ex-Engine 303)

FIRE STATION 13 - 340 KIMBALL AVENUE (SOUTHEAST) - Built 1956

Engine 313 (4173) - 2017 Ferrara Ultra (2000/500) (SN#H-5952)

Ladder 73 - 2021 Ferrara Inferno LP102 (-/-/102' rear-mount)

Foam Unit (04-1) - 2004 American LaFrance Eagle (1000/500) (Ex-Engine 306, Ex-Engine 317)

FIRE STATION 14 - 2187 CENTRAL PARK AVENUE (COLONIAL HEIGHTS / NORTHEAST) - Built 1958

Engine 314 (4176) - 2017 Ferrara Ultra (2000/500) (SN#H-5953)

Ladder 70 (4221) 2021 Ferrara Inferno LP102 (-/-/102' rear-mount)

Engine 316 (065) (Spare) - 2005 American LaFrance Eagle (1000/500) (Ex-Engine 304)

FIRE HEADQUARTERS - 470 NEPPERHAN AVENUE

Car 1 (Commissioner) - 2017 Ford Police Interceptor Utility / Proliner

Car 2 (Deputy Chief) - 2017 Ford Police Interceptor Utility / Proliner

Car 3 (Deputy Chief) - 2017 Ford Police Interceptor Utility / Proliner

Car 4 (Deputy Chief) - 2019 Ford Expedition 4x4 / Proliner

SPECIAL OPERATIONS / STORAGE FACILITY - 460 NEPPERHAN AVENUE

Car 5 (Safety Battalion) - 2013 Chevrolet Tahoe 4x4 (Ex-Battalion 2)

Car 7 (SOC Battalion) - 2013 Chevrolet Tahoe 4x4

Car 45 (EMS Supervisor) - 2014 Chevrolet Silverado 2500 4x4

Mask Service Unit 1 (044) - 2004 Freightliner / American LaFrance

Mask Service Unit 2 (Support Unit) - 2011 Ford F-350 4x4 / TCD (Ex-Battalion 1, ex-Battalion Spare)

Mask Service Unit 5 - Trailer

Emergency Management Transport Unit - 2013 Thomas / Sartin Services (Shared resource with the YPD. Located at the YPD Emergency Services Division Facility on Yonkers Avenue)

Rescue 80 (USAR Task Force Unit) - 2008 Freightliner M2 112 / 2008 Hackney 40' tractor-drawn

Field Command Unit - 2008 Freightliner / MBF Industries walk-around

Field Communications Unit - 2008 Ford transport Kevin Busch

Field Support Unit 1 - 2008 Ford F-350 4x4

Field Support Unit 2 - 2008 Ford F-350 4x4

Field Support Unit 3 - 2008 Ford F-350 4x4

Field Support Unit 5 - 2002 Ford Expedition 4x4

Field Support Unit 6 - 2009 Ford F-350 4x4

Field Support Unit 7 - 1986/2004 Ford tractor

Field Support Unit 8 - 2008 Mack Granite tractor

Field Support Unit 9 - 2009 Mack Granite tractor

Field Support Unit 10 - 2008 Thomas Special Operations transport bus

Field Support Unit 11 - 2008 Ford F-650 flatbed with crane

Haz-Mat. Support Unit 2 - 2008 Ford E bus decon. support

Haz-Mat. Support Unit 3 - 2012 Freightliner / 2012 Hackney 40' tractor-drawn

Water Tender Trailer - 1998 / 2008 Kaiser (-/5000 tractor-drawn)

YFD Special Operations Marine Jet Ski's - Pair on a Trailer

Gator 1 - YFD Special Operations UTV

Special Operations Van - 2008 Ford Econoline

Fleet Services Unit - 2007 Ford / Knapheide Fleet Services maintenance

Engine 315 (Reserve) (073) - 2006 American LaFrance Eagle (1000/500) (Ex-Engine 307)

Engine 317 (Reserve) (041)- 2004 American LaFrance Eagle (1000/500) (Ex-Engine 306)

Engine 318 (Spare) (064) - 2005 American LaFrance Eagle (1000/500) (Ex-Engine 314)

Engine 319 (Reserve) (072) - 2006 American LaFrance Eagle (1000/500) (Ex-Engine 312)

Squad 21 (Spare) (4102) - 2010 Spartan Gladiator / Smeal pumper (1500/500)

Ladder 77 (Reserve) (029) - 2002 HME / Smeal (-/-/100' rear-mount) (Ex-Ladder 72)

Ladder 79 (Reserve) - 2007 HME / Smeal (-/-/100' rear-mount) (Ex-Ladder 73)

Tower Ladder 80 (Spare) (8-11) - 2008 American LaFrance Eagle (-/-/75' LTI mid-mount platform) (Ex-Tower Ladder 71)

Battalion 3 (Reserve) - 2019 Ford Expedition 4x4 / Proliner

Battalion 4 (Spare) - 2013 Chevrolet Tahoe 4x4 (Ex-Battalion 1)

Truck 5 (Historical) - 1958 ALF (100' mid-mount) (Ex-USAF) - Located behind the DPW Salt Shed behind Murray's Skating Rink on Tuckahoe Road

See also
 List of New York fire departments

References

External links

 Official Website
 IAFF Local 628 - Yonkers Firefighter's Union
 City of Yonkers Official Website

Fire departments in New York (state)
Yonkers, New York